Group D of the Copa América Centenario consisted of Argentina, defending champions Chile, Panama, and Bolivia. Matches began on 6 June and ended on 14 June 2016. All times are EDT (UTC−4).

Argentina and Chile advanced to the quarter-finals.

Teams

Notes

Standings

In the quarter-finals:
The winner of Group D, Argentina, advanced to play the runner-up of Group C, Venezuela.
The runner-up of Group D, Chile, advanced to play the winner of Group C, Mexico.

Matches

Panama vs Bolivia
The two teams had met in four previous encounters, the latest being a friendly held at the Estadio Ramón Tahuichi Aguilera in Santa Cruz, which Panama won 3–1. This match marked Panama's debut in Copa América, making them the third Central American country to appear at the tournament, after Costa Rica and Honduras.

Argentina vs Chile
The two teams had met in eighty-six previous occasions, the last being a 2018 FIFA World Cup qualifying match held at the Estadio Nacional Julio Martínez Prádanos in Santiago in early 2016, which Argentina won 2–1. Their last Copa América meeting was the 2015 Copa América Final, where Chile earned their first Copa América title by defeating Argentina 4–1 in a penalty shoot-out after a scoreless draw.

Chile vs Bolivia
The two teams had met in forty-one previous occasions, the last being a 2015 Copa América group stage match won by Chile 5–0.

Argentina vs Panama
The two teams had met in just one previous occasion, a friendly match held at the Estadio Brigadier General Estanislao López in 2011, won by Argentina 3–1.

Chile vs Panama
The two teams had met in three previous occasions, the last being a friendly held at the Estadio Municipal Francisco Sánchez Rumoroso in Coquimbo in 2010, which Chile won 2–1.

Argentina vs Bolivia
The two teams had met in thirty-six previous occasions, the last being a 2018 FIFA World Cup qualifying match held at the Estadio Mario Alberto Kempes in Córdoba in early 2016, which Argentina won 2–0. Their last Copa América meeting was in the 2011 group stage, where the match finished as a 1–1 draw.

References

External links
CONCACAF standings

Group D
2016 in Argentine football
2015–16 in Chilean football
2015–16 in Panamanian football
2015–16 in Bolivian football